Phaea acromela is a species of beetle in the family Cerambycidae. It was described by Francis Polkinghorne Pascoe in 1858. It is known from Mexico.

References

acromela
Beetles described in 1858